The Extraordinary Adventures of Alfred Kropp is a 2005 novel by American author Rick Yancey.

A sequel, Alfred Kropp: The Seal of Solomon, was released in May 2007. A third book, Alfred Kropp: The Thirteenth Skull, was released June 24, 2008.

Plot summary 

An orphan teenager named Alfred Kropp lives in a small apartment with his Uncle Farrell, who is a security guard. His dad left when he was born and his mom died when he was twelve. He stays mostly secluded, both at home and at school. A man named Arthur Myers calls Alfred's uncle at work, and offers one million dollars for the return of an object stolen from him, a sword, by Uncle Farrell's boss, Bernard Samson. Basically, Alfred has to break into the main office, find the safe, and steal the sword himself, accidentally cutting himself on the blade. Then when he is about to leave, he is attacked by three monks armed with swords as well. A battle ensues, but Alfred manages to defeat them though he has never fought with a sword whereas his enemies seem experienced. Alfred and Uncle Farrell manage to escape to their apartment, where they are attacked by Arthur Myers. He steals the sword, and kills Uncle Farrell, but spares Alfred.

Alfred meets Bernard Samson who explains to him that Arthur Myers was an alias of an international terrorist, who wanted control of Bernard's sword, which was Excalibur, and that the monks were actually the heirs of knights who vowed to protect the sword. Bernard Samson goes off to Xàtiva, Spain, to try to reclaim the Sword from Myers, whom he knows as Mogart. A member of an international organization called OIPEP interjects that their codename for Mogart is 'The Dragon'. When Alfred asks Samson if there is anything he can do to help, Samson replies, "Pray." Alfred returns to his normal life unwillingly, and is taken into a foster home owned by a family called the Tuttles.

Alfred, unsatisfied with his normal life, takes to hanging around the nearby town, particularly the cafes. There, Alfred recognizes Bennacio, a knight protector of the sword (and the lead monk who attacked him). Bennacio reveals that all the defenders, including Samson, were killed at Xàtiva, and the sword was lost. After relating this, Bennacio leaves the coffee shop they were in and Alfred follows him. Alfred sees Bennacio get attacked and attempts to save him. They go to Bennacio's room at the Marriott, where Bennacio uses Alfred's blood to heal the wound. Bennacio explains to Alfred that Excalibur has the power to heal, and that having been cut by it, Alfred has been granted the power to heal.

The next day, Bennacio is ready to leave without Alfred, but he pleads to the knight to help in any way he can. Bennacio offers Alfred a chance to drive him. They drive to Canada (in a Mercedes Benz). On the way, Bennacio reveals him that Bernard Samson was the heir of Lancelot and that he is the heir of Bedivere, the knight who was charged to put Excalibur back into the lake when Arthur died, but who could not resolve to do it, leading to the conflict between Mogart who is revealed to be a former knight banished by Samson, and the rest of the Order. Bennacio explains that as the heir of Bedivere, he feels guilty and wants to make amends for his ancestor's failure. Then they steal a Ferrari Enzo, but are attacked by more of Mogart's henchmen. Bennacio kills them when he has the chance and then continues on their journey. They stop at the house of a deceased knight, Windimar. Though Windimar's mother, Miriam, does not want to welcome Alfred at first, resenting him for her son's death since he stole the sword, Bennacio manages to convince her and they spend the night in the house. The next day, before they leave Miriam, who can foretell the future, tells them Alfred will forsake Bennacio, resulting in the knight's death and she tells Alfred he will die as well, killed by Mogart. They leave the next day, and get attacked once again. This time there are six of them on Suzuki Hayabusas. Bennacio manages to take them out using a bow and arrows.

After the Ferrari runs out of gasoline, Alfred and Bennacio first hijack a police car, then later a Jaguar, though Bennacio gives the Jaguar's owner a blank check to pay for the car.

Alfred and Bennacio continue to Nova Scotia where they are attacked again, but are rescued by Mike Arnold, an agent of OIPEP. They then fly to France. In France, Alfred meets Bennacio's daughter, Natalia. To begin with, she is quite cold with Alfred, since his theft forces the members of the order, especially Bennacio who wants to clear his ancestor's name, to go on a nearly suicidal mission, making her fear for her father's life. However, one night, Alfred tells her his mother died from cancer without any chance of survival whereas Bennacio still has a chance and they start a friendship.  Bennacio tells Alfred that he is Bernard Samson's son, thus the heir of Lancelot, and convinces him to make a vow to protect Excalibur with his life.

OIPEP offers to trade 10.5 billion dollars for the sword.  The exchange happens at Stonehenge. However, Mogart double crosses them and slaughters them. Bennacio tries to fight Mogart knowing full well he cannot overpower him since his foe has Excalibur. Mogart disarms and kills him leaving Alfred who was prevented from helping by Mike Arnold, member of OIPEP, as the last man standing. Alfred manages to free himself from Arnold's grip and runs to Mogart, strikes him and eventually manages to take Excalibur from him. He then escapes with Mike Arnold. Though Arnold claims he kept him away from the battle to save his life, Alfred understands that he is a traitor working for Mogart and that he is the one who set up the exchange, allowing Mogart to kill Bennacio, the last knight alive. Therefore, Alfred runs away with Excalibur, steals a van and take shelter in a hotel.

There he is contacted by Mogart  who tells him he has kidnapped Natalia and will kill her unless Alfred brings him Excalibur. Alfred personally travels to the location indicated by Mogart, which turns out to be Merlin's cave in England in order to save Bennacio's daughter. Here, in Merlin's Cave in Tintagel, Alfred finds Mike again and forces him to lead him to Mogart but decides to spare his life, only knocking him out. Then he meets Mogart again and hands over Excalibur but Mogart betrays him again and stabs Natalia before attacking him with Excalibur. Once again, Mogart has the upper hand thanks to Excalibur. He disarms Alfred who reveals to him he is the heir of Lancelot, the son of Bernard Samson who Mogart loathes. Hearing this, Mogart flies into a rage and impales Alfred, pinning him to the wall of the cave, while telling him how he tortured Samson until he could no longer beg for his life, then beheaded him and fed his head to the crows in Xàtiva. Alfred dies and has a vision of a lady in a garden. Then he finds his true destiny as the master of the Sword. As in the original King Arthur stories, Mogart is unable to pull the sword out of the stone as only the Master of the Sword can claim it. Kropp, having revived, pulls the sword out of the stone, beheads Mogart, heals Natalia with his blood (since he was wounded by Excalibur) and returns home as a hero. At the end of the story, Alfred finds that he yearns for more excitement and calls OIPEP, wanting a job fighting "agents of darkness."

Characters 
 Alfred Kropp: The narrator and title protagonist of the story. A big tall kid who likes to read and watch television, never seems to fit in and underachieves. Later he is found to be descended from Lancelot- a knight of the round table.
 Uncle Farrell: A security guard at Samson Industries and Alfred's uncle and guardian. Mogart hires him to steal the sword, and later kills him with Excalibur.
 Bernard Samson: Leader of the knights and descendant of Lancelot. He dies in a battle trying to retrieve the sword in Xàtiva, Spain. He is also revealed to be Alfred's true father.
 Mogart/Mr. Myers: The main antagonist. He hires Uncle Farrell to steal Excalibur,  later impales him by stabbing him with the sword. He wanted ownership of the sword and leadership of the knights, but this became impossible with the birth of Alfred, the heir of Lancelot and the true leader of the Knights. He is cast out of their Order and wants revenge.
 Bennacio: The last knight from the Order. He is the only survivor from the attack on Mogart's castle in Xàtiva, Spain and was sent to Alfred by order of Bernard Samson. He and Alfred spend most of the book trying to retrieve the sword.
 Mike Arnold: An agent of the organization OIPEP who betrays Alfred, Bennacio, and OIPEP to gain the sword. By joining sides with Mogart, he set up the murder of Bennacio and Alfred, though Alfred escapes.
 Abigail Smith: A high level OIPEP agent. At the end of the book, she offers Alfred a job at OIPEP, but later (in The Seal of Solomon) tells him that he is not old enough.
 Mogart's henchmen: Fast, silent, and good sword fighters.
 Natalia: Daughter of Bennacio. At first she has negative feelings toward Alfred, but later readjusts her views when he comes to rescue her from Mogart.

References

2005 American novels
Young adult fantasy novels
American young adult novels
Modern Arthurian fiction